Beyond the Beyond, known in Japan as , is a role-playing video game that was developed by Camelot Software Planning and published by Sony Computer Entertainment for the PlayStation in 1995. Though not the first role-playing game released for the PlayStation, Beyond the Beyond was the first RPG available in the west for the console using a traditional Japanese RPG gameplay style like Final Fantasy, Dragon Quest and Phantasy Star. The characters were designed by popular manga artist Ami Shibata.

Gameplay 

Gameplay in Beyond the Beyond is, for the most part, standard for a role-playing video game. However, the turn-based battle system does contain one feature that was not standard in role-playing games at the time. Dubbed the "Active Playing System", this feature allows the player to increase the chances of either landing an improved attack on an enemy or defending from an enemy attack by pressing the X button at the correct time during battle. It is similar to the timing-based attacks in the later role-playing game Final Fantasy VIII (1999).

Plot 
Long ago in the world of Beyond the Beyond, a battle raged between the 'Beings of Light' and the 'Warlocks of the Underworld'. Before the planet was destroyed, the two sides signed a treaty leaving the surface world to the Beings of Light and underground to the Warlocks. After hundreds of years of peace, inexplicable happenings begin to occur. The player must control Finn, a young swordsman, to stop the evil power that has broken the treaty and invaded the surface world.

Characters 
Playable:
Finn: the 14-year-old main character, in training to become a knight after his mother's death. Revealed by prophecy to be the savior of the world from the "Vicious Ones", a group of four mysterious and evil magicians from the Underworld.
Steiner: a baby dragon that Finn keeps, and his best friend, has the potential to assist him in battle.
Annie: a 13-year-old friend of Finn's and daughter of Galahad, she fills the healing role during the game as a Cleric. It is implied that she has a crush on Finn.
Percy: a 20-year-old knight at Marion Castle. Returns home to Isla village, critically wounded from a fight from Bandore troops, but is saved by Annie. He is Galahad's son and Annie's older brother.
Samson: a 32-year-old soldier, revered for his bravery, he is cursed and loses much of his strength shortly after appearing. Has the lowest LP in the game, and is the slowest of all characters, but also has the highest strength. He has no magic.
Edward: a 13-year-old magician and the prince of Marion. Has the highest MP of all the magic users and specializes in mostly elemental (Fire, Ice, Thunder, etc.) spells. He is pretty slow at first but after being upgraded he becomes the fastest in speed. Has the lowest defense of anyone in the game.
Domino: a 28-year-old pirate collecting treasure throughout the world who joins the party in order to pay his debt to Finn, who saved his life. He also seeks revenge against the 'Vicious Ones'. His weapon(s) of choice are throwing knives. Has the highest Luck in the game.
Tont: another young magician who hails from the ancient village of Simone. He had accidentally metamorphosed into an anthropomorphic blob by a potion. He is a caster of offensive spells like Edward; but unlike him, Tont's magic revolves around summoning creatures.
Lorele: a monk and the Princess of the kingdom of Barbaros.

Non-playable:
Galahad: the –semi-retired– 50-year-old former leader of Marion's knights. Finn's guardian and father of Percy and Annie.
Kevins: at age 39, he is the leader of the Marion Knights and as such was forced to entrust his son Finn to Galahad's care, he supposedly sacrificed himself by staying in Hell to prevent Akkadias's forces from invading the surface, but was rescued and brought back to the surface world by Finn.
Shutat: a mysterious man serving directly under the emperor of Bandore, he was taken over by an evil being named Akkadias.
Ramue: a cold-hearted witch reporting directly to Shutat, she has strong magical abilities. She places a curse on Samson in Marion to render him weak, in order to make the heroes appear as frauds to Zalagoon's king.
Dagoot: another of Shutat's three generals, he is a master archer.
Yeon: a strange goblin-like being, he is the last of Shutat's generals and has magic rivaling that of Ramue. He is a minion of Akkadias sent to monitor Shutat.
Zeon: the village chief of Simone as well as the strongest magician in the world.
Glade: adviser to the king of Zalagoon, he planned to betray Zalagoon with the Bandore forces by using Samson's curse against the party, but once his scheme is exposed, he went insane with fear and metamorphosed himself into a monster with Shutat's pill.
Akkadias: an evil being that fills the 'Devil' role, is the ringleader behind the 'Vicious Ones' and is the final boss of the game.

Development
The soundtrack was composed by Motoi Sakuraba, who later worked on other Camelot Soft titles such as Shining Force III and the Golden Sun series along with other series such as Star Ocean and Valkyrie Profile.

For the North American release, Beyond the Beyond was translated into English by four production personnel at Sony Computer Entertainment America.

Reception 

Critical assessments of Beyond the Beyond were divided upon its release: While Shawn Smith and Sushi-X of Electronic Gaming Monthly found it to be an impressive RPG, Dan Hsu and Crispin Boyer in the same publication and Glenn Rubenstein in GameSpot deemed it derivative and underwhelming, though still a solid and satisfying enough experience for fans of the genre, GamePros Scary Larry considered it outright "lame and predictable", and Next Generation described it as "painfully derivative, plodding, and not even a terribly challenging adventure". However, there were points of agreement, with even the most positive reviews remarking that the game has a very generic RPG visual style and simply does not look like a next generation RPG, though some also remarked that the 3D battle graphics are impressive.

Most reviews said that the story is highly derivative and suffers from overlong, dull dialogues, though Next Generation, which otherwise gave one of the more negative reviews, said the story was pleasingly long and interesting. While Shawn Smith and Dan Hsu praised the music, Glenn Rubenstein, Scary Larry, and IGN all called it tepid and generic, and criticized that it is in MIDI format instead of the high quality Red Book audio that was by this time standard for CD games. Another common criticism was that the battles are excessively frequent.

The game maintains a 44% average rating on GameRankings, from 8 reviews. Official PlayStation Magazine gave it their lowest possible score of 0.5 out of 5. Other review scores for the game included a 6 out of 10 from Electric Playground. In a retrospective review, Andrew Long of RPGamer argued that the extensive time it takes to complete the game is due mostly to long and complex dungeons, frequent random encounters, and the steep difficulty of bosses.

References

External links 

 
 

1995 video games
Camelot Software Planning games
PlayStation (console)-only games
Fantasy video games
Role-playing video games
Sony Interactive Entertainment games
PlayStation (console) games
Video games developed in Japan
Video games scored by Motoi Sakuraba
Single-player video games